The Slaghmuylder Brewery is a small brewery in Ninove, Belgium. It was founded in 1860 and is still run by the same family.

The brewery is notable also for having brewed one of the first of the modern tripels, a type of strong, golden pale ale. According to beer historian Michael Jackson, the first such beer was brewed in 1931 by Hendrik Verlinden, who was a brewer at the nearby Drie Linden Brewery and regularly assisted the monks of the Trappist Westmalle Brewery; in 1932, then working for Slaghmuylder, produced the tripel first called Witkap Pater, now known as Witkap Tripel. Their tripel is still praised as one of the best available.

Besides the Witkap singles, doubles, and tripels, the company also brews seasonal and occasional beers. In 2009, Cornel was brewed for carnival celebrations, and in 2010 Gouden Wortel was brewed to celebrate the brewery's 150th anniversary. Their beers are exported to the United States and since 2009 also to Japan.

Products
Witkap Pater Single, a single with 6% ABV
Paasbier, a seasonal pilsner served around Easter with 6% ABV
Witkap Pater Stimulo, a single with 6% ABV

References
Notes

Bibliography

External links

Food and drink companies established in 1860
1860 establishments in Belgium
Breweries of Flanders
Companies based in East Flanders
Ninove